The 1939 Northeastern Huskies football team represented Northeastern University during the 1939 college football season. It was the program's seventh season and they finished with a winless record of 0–6–1 (0–2 in New England Conference play). Their head coach was James W. Dunn serving in his third season, and their captain was Cornelius Sullivan.

Schedule

References

Northeastern
Northeastern Huskies football seasons
College football winless seasons
Northeastern Huskies football